Trina Evette Braxton-Scales (born December 3, 1974) is an American singer and reality television personality. She is the younger sister of R&B singing icon Toni Braxton. Trina had her first big break in music in 1992 as a founding member of the R&B group The Braxtons, formed with her sisters. After losing two members, The Braxtons released their only album, So Many Ways, as a trio in 1996 along with four singles: "So Many Ways", "Only Love", "The Boss", and "Slow Flow".

In 2011, Braxton reunited with her sisters for the We TV reality show, Braxton Family Values. The first season was the #1 rated reality show on WE tv, and the network ordered a 13-episode second season of the show after the third episode. Trina released her first solo single called "Party or Go Home" on March 2012. Since September 2018, Braxton is a co-host of "Sister Circle" talk show for the TV One and TEGNA networks from 12:00 p.m. – 1 p.m., along with Quad Webb-Lunceford, Syleena Johnson and Rashan Ali.

Braxton has starred in several movies and launched a line of notably successful hair and bar companies.  Trina Braxton is widely regarded as the Braxton sister with business acumen, having created several successful brands and other business endeavors, which lends her net worth to be 1.5 million dollars

Early life 
She was born in Severn, Maryland. Her father, Michael Conrad Braxton Sr., was a Methodist clergyman and power company worker, and her mother, Evelyn Jackson, a native of South Carolina, was a former opera singer and cosmetologist, as well as a pastor. Braxton's maternal grandfather was also a pastor. Braxton has an older brother named Michael, Jr. (born in 1968) and four sisters named Toni (born in 1966), Towanda (born in 1973), Traci (1971-2022), and Tamar (born in 1977). Braxton and her siblings were raised in a strict religious household, and Braxton's first performing experience was singing in her church choir.

Career

1990–1997: Career beginnings and The Braxtons 
Toni, Traci, Towanda, Trina, and Tamar Braxton signed their first record deal with Arista Records in 1989. In 1990, they released their first single, "Good Life". It would be their only single as a fivesome. "Good Life" was not a hit, peaking at No. 79 on the Billboard Hot R&B/Hip-Hop Singles chart. At the time of the single's release, the members' age differences created a problem with marketing. Subsequently, The Braxtons were dropped from Arista Records.

In 1991, during a showcase with Antonio "L.A." Reid and Kenneth "Babyface" Edmonds, who were in the process of forming LaFace Records, Toni Braxton, minus her four sisters, was chosen and signed as the label's first female solo artist. At the time, the remaining members were told that LaFace was not looking for another girl group since it had just signed TLC.

After Toni's departure from the group in 1991, the remaining Braxtons members became backup singers for Toni's first U.S. tour, music videos, and promotional appearances. Traci, Towanda, Trina, and Tamar were featured in the music video for Toni Braxton's third single, "Seven Whole Days", from her self-titled debut album.

In 1993, LaFace Records A&R Vice President, Bryant Reid, signed The Braxtons to LaFace. However, the group never released an album or single for the record label. When Reid moved on to work for Atlantic Records, he convinced executives at LaFace to allow him take the group to Atlantic also.
It was reported in Vibe magazine that in 1995, Traci Braxton had left the group to pursue a career as a youth counselor. However, it was not confirmed until a 2011 promotional appearance on The Mo'Nique Show, that Traci was not allowed to sign with Atlantic because of her pregnancy at the time.

In June 1996, Tamar, Trina, and Towanda returned with a new album entitled So Many Ways, which shared the same title as its lead single. Released on August 13, 1996, the album peaked at No. 26 on the Billboard R&B/Hip-Hop Albums charts. It became their first and only LP. Atlantic Records A&R VP, Bryant Reid, served as the album's executive producer. At the time of its release, Reid told Billboard Magazine, "I had a vision for them then that was about young sophistication with sex appeal." So Many Ways included production from Jermaine Dupri and Daryl Simmons along with Christopher "Tricky" Stewart and Sean "Sep" Hall. The album also included a cover of Diana Ross's hit "The Boss" and Klymaxx's song "I'd Still Say Yes".
The Braxtons released a music video in order to promote "So Many Ways". It was directed by Cameron Casey and featured upcoming actor Mekhi Phifer. The trio also performed a remixed version of "So Many Ways" with rapper Jay-Z on September 9, 1996, at the Soul Train Lady of Soul Awards. The single was also used as the opening track for the soundtrack to the comedy film High School High. "So Many Ways" went on to peak at No. 83 on the Billboard Hot 100 chart in 1996, No. 22 on the Billboard R&B Charts and number 32 on the UK Singles Chart in January 1997.

The album's second single, "Only Love", was released on January 25, 1997, and peaked at number 52 on the Billboard R&B/Hip-Hop Songs Chart. A music video for this song was also released. A Masters At Work remix version of The Braxtons' cover of "The Boss" reached number 1 on Billboard Dance/Club Play Chart in early 1997. Slow Flow was the final single released from So Many Ways. It peaked at No. 26 on the UK Charts in July 1997, becoming their highest charting single in the UK. The Braxtons also served as the opening act for Toni Braxton on the European Leg of her Secrets Tour in 1997. The Braxtons decided to part ways as a group after lead singer Tamar Braxton left to pursue a solo career with DreamWorks Records in 1998. However, the members continued to sing and act in various other projects.

1997–2014: Solo career 
Braxton appeared in the 2004 Tyler Perry play Meet the Browns as Tracy Stevens. She was also part of the play Rise, written by Salt from Salt-n-Pepa and Christopher "Play" Martin from the rap group Kid 'n Play and starred in an off-Broadway production of Dreamgirls as Deena Jones. In 2004, Trina Braxton appeared in "The Walk" with Eva Pigford and Regina Belle. Additionally, she co-starred in two independent films, including Jail Party, and was host for the unbroadcast Urban Idol for UPN. Trina and Tamar performed as background singers and dancers for the entire duration of Toni's Libra Tour in 2006. They also performed in Toni Braxton: Revealed at the Flamingo Hotel and Casino until R&B singer Sparkle replaced Tamar in 2006 and fellow former Braxtons member Towanda Braxton replaced them.

In 2009, Trina joined the wedding band "Simply Irresistible" as a lead vocalist. She also made a cameo in Tyler Perry's I Can Do Bad All By Myself as a member of a band performing with singer Mary J. Blige's character. In 2011, Braxton reunited with her sisters for the WE tv reality show, Braxton Family Values. Trina and Towanda, her sister, are backup dancers for older sister Toni. In 2012, Braxton began her solo career, after signing with Soltri Entertainment. Her solo debut single, "Party or Go Home", was released on March 22, 2012. The music video accompanying the song was directed by Derek Blanks. Trina also guest starred along with her sister Tamar on TV Land's new sitcom The Soul Man starring Cedric The Entertainer.

In 2013, she released the single Game Time. The same year, she was featured on the song The Chipmunk Song (Christmas Don't Be Late), on her sister Tamar's Winter Loversland. In 2014, she landed a role in the TV movie Where's The Love, alongside David Banner and Denise Boutte. At the same time, Braxton, and her sisters Toni and Towanda guest starred on their sister Traci's music video "Last Call".

2015–present: Braxton Family Christmas, Sister Circle talk show and other projects 
The group, including Toni, Tamar, Traci, Trina and Towanda, released Braxton Family Christmas on October 30, 2015. Braxton Family Christmas debuted at number 27 on the US Billboard R&B/Hip-Hop Albums, number 10 on the US R&B Chart and number 12 on US Top Holiday Albums on November 21, 2015. The album charted at number 1 on the US Heatseekers Albums on December 12, 2015.

On April 20, 2018, Trina, Towanda and Toni featured on their sister Traci's single "Broken Things".

From September 10, 2018, to March 2020, Braxton served as a co-host of "Sister Circle" talk show for the TV One and TEGNA networks from 12:00 p.m. – 1 p.m., along with Quad Webb-Lunceford, Syleena Johnson and Rashan Ali.

On October 20, 2018, she starred in the stage play Head Over Heels, alongside Angie Stone, Karyn White, Q Parker, William Jackson, Tony Tone & Big Que.

On November 30, 2019, she starred in the BET Christmas movie Hip Hop Holiday, alongside Ta'Rhonda Jones, Andra Fuller, Wendy Raquel Robinson and Melba Moore.

On May 7, 2021, she acted in the movie Sisters and the Shrink 2. The movie was available on Amazon.

Other endeavors 
In parallel of her artistic career, she is the co-owner of the recording studio, The Bass Mint, located in Atlanta, which includes a recording studio and a studio to make films, television projects and music videos and founded her production company named Soltri Entertainment. In 2014, she had launched her first hair collection line. She had launched her first bar company Bar-Chix.

Personal life 
In 2003, she married software developer Gabriel "Gabe" Solis. The two were married for ten years, then separating in 2013 and divorce finalized in 2015. Solis passed away on December 20, 2018, of cancer at the age of 43.

Several days prior to the Braxton Family Values Season 6 premiere, Trina became engaged to boyfriend Von Scales while in Napa Valley. They married in December 2019. Sister Tamar confirmed the impending marriage during an appearance on the Wendy Williams Show on September 18, 2019. In June 2021, Trina became a member of Alpha Kappa Alpha sorority.

Discography

Singles 
 2012: "Party or Go Home"
 2013: "Game Time"
 2013: "All Over the World" (J. Ahmad, VaShawn Mitchell, Anthony David, Terrell Carter, Trina Braxton, Casme, Lisa Denise & Artia Lockett)

Other songs 
 2013: The Chipmunk Song (Christmas Don't Be Late) (Tamar Braxton duet with Trina Braxton)
 2018: Broken Things (Traci Braxton featuring Toni Braxton, Towanda Braxton and Trina Braxton)

Filmography

Films 
 2004: Meet the Browns (play) as Tracey
 2005: Jail Party as Kiana
 2005: The Walk as Dawn
 2009: I Can Do Bad All by Myself (cameo)
 2014: Where's the Love? as Kendra (TV movie)
 2015: Side Piece as herself
 2019: Hip Hop Holiday as Karen Corvey
 2021: Sisters and the Shrink 2 as First Lady

TV series 
 2011–present: Braxton Family Values (as herself, 2011–present)
 2018: Iyanla: Fix My Life (as herself,)
 2018–2020: Sister Circle (co-host, as herself)

Theatre 
 2004: Dreamgirls as Deena Jones
 2004: Meet the Browns as Tracy Stevens
 2018: Head Over Heels

References

External links 

1974 births
Living people
People from Severn, Maryland
Musicians from Maryland
The Braxtons members
American contemporary R&B singers
African-American television talk show hosts
American television talk show hosts
21st-century African-American women singers
Methodists from Maryland